Edward E. Clark (born May 4, 1930) is an American lawyer and politician who ran for governor of California in 1978, and for president of the United States as the nominee of the Libertarian Party in the 1980 presidential election.

Clark is an honors graduate of Tabor Academy, Dartmouth College, and received a J.D. degree from Harvard Law School. Formerly a liberal Republican, he joined the Libertarian Party following President Richard Nixon's imposition of wage and price controls in 1971.

1978 California gubernatorial campaign
In 1978, Clark received some 377,960 votes, 5.5% of the popular vote, in a race for governor of California.  Although a member of the Libertarian Party, he appeared on the California ballot as an independent candidate.

Another factor leading to the unprecedented (for California) 5.5% vote total for Clark was his libertarian campaign occurring the same year as the successful Proposition 13 which limited property taxes, and the unsuccessful anti-gay Briggs Initiative (Proposition 6).  Clark and the California Libertarian Party campaigned in support for Proposition 13 and in opposition to Proposition 6 both of which turned out people to the polls who might be more inclined to favor a libertarian candidate.

Clark lost the race to Jerry Brown, who was re-elected with 56.0% of the vote.  Republican nominee Evelle J. Younger had 36.5% of the vote.

1980 presidential campaign
In 1979 Clark won the Libertarian Party presidential nomination at the party's convention in Los Angeles, California. He published a book on his programs, A New Beginning, with an introduction by Eugene McCarthy. During the campaign, Clark positioned himself as a peace candidate and emphasized both large budget and tax cuts, as well as outreach to liberals and progressives unhappy with the resumption of Selective Service registration and the arms race with the Soviet Union. Clark was endorsed by the Peoria Journal Star of Peoria, Illinois.

When asked in a television interview to summarize libertarianism, Clark used the phrase "low-tax liberalism," causing some consternation among traditional libertarian theorists, most notably Murray Rothbard. Clark's running to the center marked the start of a split within the Libertarian Party between a moderate faction led by Ed Crane and a radical faction led by Rothbard that eventually came to a head in 1983, with the moderate faction walking out of the party convention after the nomination for the 1984 presidential race went to David Bergland.

Ed Clark's running mate in 1980 was David H. Koch of Koch Industries, who pledged part of his personal fortune to the campaign for the vice-presidential nomination, enabling the Clark/Koch ticket to largely self-fund and run national television advertising.

Clark received 921,128 votes (1.1% of the total nationwide); the highest number and percentage of popular votes a Libertarian Party candidate had ever received in a presidential race up to that point. His strongest support was in Alaska, where he came in third place with 11.7% of the vote, finishing ahead of independent candidate John Anderson and receiving almost half as many votes as Jimmy Carter. Clark's record for most votes won by a Libertarian presidential candidate stood for 32 years until it was broken by Gary Johnson in 2012.  His Libertarian vote percentage of 1.1% ranks 3rd behind Johnson's 3.3% showing in 2016 and Jo Jorgensen's 1.2% performance in 2020.

References

Further reading

External links
  (2012)
  (1996)

1930 births
20th-century American politicians
American lawyers
California Libertarians
Dartmouth College alumni
Harvard Law School alumni
Libertarian Party (United States) presidential nominees
Living people
Tabor Academy (Massachusetts) alumni
Candidates in the 1980 United States presidential election
People from Middleborough, Massachusetts
Candidates in the 1978 United States elections